Microbacterium suwonense is a Gram-positive, non-spore-forming and non-motile bacterium from the genus Microbacterium which has been isolated from cow dung in Suwon in Korea.

References 

 

Bacteria described in 2012
suwonense